Harry Douglas Anderson (28 October 1926 – 15 October 2016) was a New Zealand rugby league footballer who represented New Zealand in the 1954 World Cup.

Playing career
Anderson played for Marist, Howick and Point Chevalier in the Auckland Rugby League competition. He represented Auckland and was first selected for the New Zealand national rugby league team in 1947.

Anderson was the first member of the Point Chevalier club to be selected for the Kiwis and went on to play in 22 games, including three test matches, for New Zealand. He represented the North Island in 1948 and 1949 and was part of the New Zealand side selected for the 1954 World Cup.

Anderson was forced to sit out of the 1951 and 1952 seasons due to the transfer system. In 1953 he successfully completed a transfer to Marist and played for his new club until he retired in 1957.

References

1926 births
2016 deaths
New Zealand rugby league players
New Zealand national rugby league team players
Auckland rugby league team players
Point Chevalier Pirates players
Marist Saints players
Howick Hornets players
North Island rugby league team players
Rugby league centres
Rugby league five-eighths